Vitali Vasilyevich Kazantsev (born 4 July 1981) is a Russian football coach and former player.

External links

References 

1981 births
People from Volgodonsk
Sportspeople from Rostov Oblast
Living people
Russian footballers
Association football defenders
FC Olimpia Volgograd players
FC BATE Borisov players
FC Luch Vladivostok players
FC Nizhny Novgorod (2007) players
FC Torpedo-BelAZ Zhodino players
Belarusian Premier League players
Russian expatriate footballers
Expatriate footballers in Belarus